Our Mathematical Universe: My Quest for the Ultimate Nature of Reality is a 2014 nonfiction book by the Swedish-American cosmologist Max Tegmark. Written in popular science format, the book interweaves what a New York Times reviewer called "an informative survey of exciting recent developments in astrophysics and quantum theory" with Tegmark's mathematical universe hypothesis, which posits that reality is a mathematical structure. This mathematical nature of the universe, Tegmark argues, has important consequences for the way researchers should approach many questions of physics.

Summary
Tegmark, whose background and scientific research have been in the fields of theoretical astrophysics and cosmology, mixes autobiography and humor into his analysis of the universe. The book begins with an account of a bicycle accident in Stockholm in which Tegmark was killed—in some theoretical parallel universes, though not in our own.

The rest of the book is divided into three parts. Part one, "Zooming Out," deals with locating ourselves in the cosmos and/or multiverse. Part two, "Zooming In," looks for added perspective from quantum mechanics and particle physics. Part three, "Stepping Back," interweaves a scientific viewpoint with Tegmark's speculative ideas about the mathematical nature of reality. By the end of the book, Tegmark has hypothesized four different levels of multiverse.

According to Andrew Liddle, reviewing the book for Nature:The culmination that Tegmark seeks to lead us to is the “Level IV multiverse”. This level contends that the Universe is not just well described by mathematics, but, in fact, is mathematics. All possible mathematical structures have a physical existence, and collectively, give a multiverse that subsumes all others. Here, Tegmark is taking us well beyond accepted viewpoints, advocating his personal vision for explaining the Universe.

Reception
Reviews of the book are generally enthusiastic about Tegmark's ability to make scientific topics enjoyable and intelligible. For example, according to a reviewer for The Guardian:Tegmark, a professor of physics at MIT, writes at the cutting edge of cosmology and quantum theory in friendly and relaxed prose, full of entertaining anecdotes and down-to-earth analogies.

Criticism of the book seems to reflect two prominent criticisms also made of Tegmark's mathematical universe hypothesis: objections to the many worlds interpretation of quantum mechanics and objections to Tegmark's alleged Platonic idealism. For example, in a generally positive review written for The Wall Street Journal, Peter Woit says:But the great power of the scientific worldview has always come from its insistence that one should accept ideas based on experimental evidence, not on metaphysical reasoning or the truth-claims of authority figures.

Trying to balance both positive with negative views of the work, Amir Alexander wrote in The New York Times:It is difficult to say whether Dr. Tegmark’s mathematical universe will ultimately be deemed an Einsteinian triumph or a Cartesian dead end. His conclusions are simply too far removed from the frontiers of today’s mainstream science, and there is little hope that conclusive evidence will emerge anytime soon. Yet Our Mathematical Universe is nothing if not impressive. Brilliantly argued and beautifully written, it is never less than thought-provoking about the greatest mysteries of our existence.

The Independent praised the last chapter of the book, on the risks of extinction humanity faces, as "wise and bracing".

References

2014 non-fiction books
Popular physics books
Cosmology books
Alfred A. Knopf books